Topple the Giants is the second EP by American rock band Adema, released on April 2, 2013 by Pavement Entertainment. It marks the band's first release in 6 years, after the release of Kill the Headlights. It is the only release to feature guitarist Tim Fluckey on lead vocals. Additionally, it is the band's first release as a three-piece. The EP includes new music, along with older songs re-recorded with the new line-up.

Background
On July 19, 2011, the band announced that they are going in the studio soon to record their upcoming material. Later that year, they announced an EP that would be available for digital release in February 2012 with a special edition physical release in March, along with a studio album release in the summer. However, on May 22, 2012, they announced that the EP was delayed until further notice. Finally, after signing a record deal with Pavement Entertainment in January 2013, the band announced the EP's release date to be April 2, 2013.

The Metal website Metalsucks put this album artwork as considered to be one of the worst album covers ever.

Track listing
All songs written by Adema, except otherwise noted.

Personnel
 Tim Fluckey - lead vocals, lead guitar, keyboards, synthesizers, programming
 Dave DeRoo - bass guitar, backing vocals
 Kris Kohls - drums

References

Adema albums
2013 EPs